Orkut Büyükkökten (born February 6, 1975) is a Turkish software engineer who developed the social networking services Club Nexus, inCircle and Orkut. Orkut Büyükkökten is a former product manager at Google.

Career
Originally from Konya, Turkey, Büyükkökten obtained a B.Sc. degree in Computer Engineering and Information Science from Bilkent University in Ankara. He received both a M.S. and a Ph.D. in Computer Science from Stanford University. His research at Stanford focused on Web search and efficient PDA usage.

He has been building and working on online communities since 2000. He introduced his first social network, named Club Nexus, at Stanford in the fall of 2001. Club Nexus was the first college-specific social network. It was a system built to serve the networking and communication needs of the Stanford online community. Students could use Club Nexus to send e-mail and invitations, chat, post events, buy and sell used goods, search for people with similar interests, place personals, display their artwork or post editorial columns. Within a few months of its introduction in 2001, Club Nexus had attracted over 2,000 Stanford undergraduates.

Later, Büyükkökten introduced an alumni social network, named inCircle, for the Stanford Alumni Association intended for use by university alumni groups. In 2002, Büyükkökten launched a company, Affinity Engines, to commercialize inCircle and Club Nexus.

After leaving Affinity Engines and joining Google, he decided to use his 20% time to develop a social networking service. He said: "My dream was to connect all the Internet users so they can relate to each other, it can make such a difference in people's lives." The product manager and Marissa Mayer thought of naming the service after its creator. "Orkut.com" belonged to Orkut Büyükkökten himself. Google convinced him, and its social networking service was called Orkut.

Büyükkökten and Google were sued by Affinity Engines in 2004 for trade secret misappropriation. Affinity Engines claimed that Büyükkökten and Google had stolen Affinity Engines' code to launch the "Orkut.com" social networking service at Google. The lawsuit was settled in 2006.

Hello 
In 2016, he launched a new social networking service, Hello. The social networking site can be customized in three languages — English, French and Portuguese. By August 2016, Hello was available in the US, Canada, France, UK, Australia, New Zealand, Ireland, and Brazil — both on iOS and Android. Hello announced its entry into the Indian market in April 2018. By September 2022, Hello had shut down.

Publications 

Conference Publications

 Orkut Buyukkokten, Hector Garcia-Molina, Andreas Paepcke "Seeing the Whole in Parts: Text Summarization for Web Browsing on Handheld Devices". The 10th International WWW Conference (WWW10). Hong Kong, China - May 1–5, 2001.
 Oliver Kaljuvee, Orkut Buyukkokten, Hector Garcia-Molina, Andreas Paepcke "Efficient Web Form Entry on PDAs". The 10th International WWW Conference (WWW10). Hong Kong, China - May 1–5, 2001.
 Orkut Buyukkokten, Hector Garcia-Molina, Andreas Paepcke "Accordion Summarization for End-Game Browsing on PDAs and Cellular Phones". Human-Computer Interaction Conference 2001 (CHI 2001). Seattle, Washington - 31 March-5 April 2001.
 Orkut Buyukkokten, Hector Garcia-Molina, Andreas Paepcke. "Focused Web Searching with PDAs". The 9th International WWW Conference (WWW9). Amsterdam, Netherlands - May 15–19, 2000.
 Orkut Buyukkokten, Hector Garcia-Molina, Andreas Paepcke, Terry Winograd. "Power Browser: Efficient Web Browsing for PDAs". Human-Computer Interaction Conference 2000 (CHI 2000). The Hague, The Netherlands - April 1–6, 2000.
 Arturo Crespo, Orkut Buyukkokten, Hector Garcia-Molina. "Efficient Query Subscription Processing in a Multicast Environment". 16th International Conference on Data Engineering (ICDE). San Diego, CA, USA, February 29 - March 3, 2000.

Workshop Publications

 Orkut Buyukkokten, Hector Garcia-Molina and Andreas Paepcke "Text Summarization of Web pages on Handheld Devices." Proceedings of Workshop on Automatic Summarization 2001 held in conjunction with NAACL 2001 (NAACL 2001), June 2001.
 Orkut Buyukkokten, Junghoo Cho, Hector Garcia-Molina and Luis Gravano "Exploiting geographical location information of web pages" Proceedings of Workshop on Web Databases (WebDB'99) held in conjunction with ACM SIGMOD'99, June 1999.

Journal Papers

 Orkut Buyukkokten, Oliver Kaljuvee, Hector Garcia-Molina, Andreas Paepcke and Terry Winograd "Efficient Web Browsing on Handheld Devices using Page and Form Summarization" ACM Transactions on Information Systems (TOIS), Volume 20, Issue 1, January 2002.
 Dominic Hughes, Orkut Buyukkokten and James Warren "Empirical Bi-action Tables: a Tool for the Evaluation and Optimization of Text Input Systems, Application I: Stylus Keyboards" ACM Transactions on Computer-Human Interaction (TOCHI), Special Issue on Mobile Text Entry. Volume 17, Issues 2 & 3, 2002.
 Arturo Crespo, Orkut Buyukkokten and Hector Garcia-Molina "Query Merging: Improving Query Subscription Processing in a Multicast Environment." IEEE Transactions on Knowledge and Data Engineering. Volume 15, 2003.

Personal life
Büyükkökten was born into a Muslim family. He married Derek Holbrook in 2008.

References

External links
 Instagram profile
 Facebook profile
 Twitter profile
 Orkut.com
 Hello.com

Turkish non-fiction writers
Turkish computer scientists
People from Konya
Computer programmers
Google employees
Stanford University School of Engineering alumni
Bilkent University alumni
Turkish LGBT scientists
1975 births
Living people
Turkish expatriates in the United States